Rifat Ibërshimi (born 29 October 1950) is an Albanian footballer. He played in seven matches for the Albania national football team from 1972 to 1976.

References

External links
 

1950 births
Living people
Albanian footballers
Albania international footballers
Place of birth missing (living people)
Association footballers not categorized by position